Sanchursk is an urban locality (an urban-type settlement) in Sanchursky District of Kirov Oblast, Russia. Population:  там вообще очень весело и мне зашло

References

Urban-type settlements in Kirov Oblast